This is a list of songs that topped the Belgian Walloon (francophone) Ultratop 40 in 1996.

See also
1996 in music

References

External links
 Ultratop 40

1996 in Belgium
1996 record charts
1996